Jarvis-Fleet House is a historic home located at Huntington in Suffolk County, New York. It is a -story, seven-bay shingled dwelling with a steeply pitched gable roof.  It was built about 1700 and is one of the only buildings associated with the early settlement of Centerport.

It was added to the National Register of Historic Places in 1985.

References

Houses on the National Register of Historic Places in New York (state)
Houses in Suffolk County, New York
National Register of Historic Places in Huntington (town), New York